Wanees Zarour (b. Ramallah, 1986) is a Chicago-based music composer, focusing on contemporary Middle Eastern Music. He is an accomplished oud, buzuq, percussion and violin player, having been featured in many international music festivals. He released his first album, Quarter to Midnight, in 2014.

Musical career
Born in Ramallah, Palestine, Zarour has trained as a musician from the age of 7.  He began with violin and quickly picked up oud, buzuq, and percussion. He has been invited to perform in major music and concerts around the world in ensemble and solo performances, including American Public Media's A Prairie Home Companion, Chicago's World Music Festival, and Day of Music at the Chicago Symphony Orchestra.

Zarour specializes in Maqam music,  teaching classes and leading ensembles mainly in the Chicago area. His compositions often fuse traditional Middle Eastern instrumentation and Maqam theory together with musical traditions ranging from free jazz to Eastern European folk, and Latin American Music such as Bossa Nova.

As of 2021, Zarour has for some years been the Director of the Middle East Music Ensemble at The University of Chicago, which performs a wide variety of  traditional and contemporary Middle Eastern music,  featuring Arab, Turkish and Persian repertoire. He also taught Maqam Theory and Middle Eastern Rhythm as a faculty member at the Old Town School of Folk Music.

Zarour has led and performed with several groups, including Duzan Ensemble and the Wanees Zarour Ensemble.  His first album, of original compositions, Quarter to Midnight was released on August 2, 2014, at Chicago's Constellation.

From 2019 through 2021 and beyond, guitarist Fareed Haque and Wanees Zarour restarted the Chicago Immigrant Orchestra, with the encouragement and financial support of the Chicago World Music Festival and the Old Town School of Folk Music.  (The orchestra's original incarnation ran from 1999 to 2004, led by Willy Schwartz.) Haque and Zarour recruited other local musicians to join them, and Haque also serves as concertmaster.

Similar Artists
Other notable artists who compose and perform music in similar Middle Eastern styles include Issa Boulos, Simon Shaheen, Bassam Saba, and Ziad Rahbani.

Discography

References

External links
Official site

American male composers
American male violinists
American oud players
Palestinian emigrants to the United States
Living people
1986 births
21st-century American composers
21st-century American violinists
21st-century American male musicians